Li Jinyuan may refer to:

 Li Jinyuan (painter) (李金远), Chinese painter
 Li Jinyuan (businessman) (李金元), Chinese businessman